The Monument to the Independence of Brazil is a granite and bronze sculpture located in the Independence Park in São Paulo, Brazil. It is also known as the Ipiranga Monument or the Altar of the Fatherland. The monument is located on the banks of the Ipiranga Brook, on the historic site where Pedro, Prince Regent (later Emperor Pedro I) proclaimed the independence of the country on 7 September 1822.

The monument was designed and built by Italian sculptor Ettore Ximenes (1855–1926) and Italian architect Manfredo Manfredi (1859–1927) to celebrate the first centenary of the Brazilian Independence.

The crypt
An Imperial Crypt and Chapel is located inside the monument. The crypt was built in 1972 to house the remains of Emperor Pedro I (also King of Portugal as Pedro IV) and his wives, Maria Leopoldina of Austria and Amélie of Leuchtenberg. The crypt is consecrated as a Catholic chapel, as demanded by the then head of the Brazilian Imperial Family, Pedro Henrique of Orléans-Braganza. He agreed to allow the transfer of the bodies of his ancestors to the monument on the condition that the place be consecrated as a Catholic place of burial, with a Catholic altar, where masses could be held. Pedro I and Amélie of Leuchtenberg's bodies were transferred from the Royal Pantheon of the House of Braganza in Lisbon; while Maria Leopoldina was moved from the Imperial Mausoleum of St Anthony's Convent in Rio de Janeiro.

Gallery

References

External links
Monument to the Independence of Brazil at the São Paulo City Museum Website 

São Paulo
Mausoleums in Brazil
Public art in Brazil
Buildings and structures completed in 1922
1922 establishments in Brazil